Little Tokyo may refer to:
 Little Tokyo, Los Angeles
 Japantown, Vancouver
 Little Tokyo, U.S.A., a 1942 American film
 Another term for a Japantown
 Little Tokyo (wrestler) (1941–2011), Japanese professional wrestler
 A block in Blok M, Jakarta, Indonesia